George Nelson Tremper High School is a high school located in Kenosha, Wisconsin. Part of the Kenosha Unified School District, it was named after George Nelson Tremper, the principal of Kenosha High School from 1911 to 1944. The mascot of Tremper High School is the Trojan.

History 
Built to relieve overcrowding at Bradford High School, the original  school was completed in the fall of 1964, with the first class graduating in June 1965.  A successful referendum in 2005 gave the school a new, larger field house, team locker rooms, and a new weight room.  In the summer of 2009, the cafeteria was remodeled and expanded into the original commons.  A 2015 referendum enabled the renovation of Ameche Field in the summer of 2017, including new bleachers and press box, a new track, and new team locker rooms, as well as enlargement of the tennis courts and turfing of the softball and baseball fields.

Controversies

Transgender Rights
In 2016, the school disallowed a transgender student from running for prom king, suggesting that he instead run for prom queen. The student initiated an online petition, and some of his schoolmates organized sit-ins, leading the Kenosha Unified School District to require the prom court ballot to list candidates "under the gender for which they identify". The school had also barred the student from using the boys' bathroom. The student filed a lawsuit against the school district with the U.S. Department of Education's Office for Civil Rights, seeking to be able to use the boys' bathroom.

Sexual Harassment

In 2019, the ACLU filed a demand letter to Kenosha Unified School District regarding the treatment of cheerleaders at Tremper and Mary D. Bradford High School. The letter discussed awards given out for teenager cheer athletes at Tremper having large breasts, as well as coaches making commentary on their genitals and other sexual comments on their bodies.

Extracurricular activities 
 African American Alliance
 Anime Club
 Art Club
 Astronomical Society
 Band of the Black Watch
 Battle of the Books
 Black Male Youth Summit
 Board Game Strategies
 Bowling
 Campus Life United
 Car Club
 Chamber Orchestra
 Cheerleading
 Chess Club
 Cultural Awareness
 DECA
 Drama
 Environmental Club
 FBLA
 FCCLA
 Fencing Club
 Gay Straight Alliance For Achievement
 Golden Strings
 HOSA
 International Club
 International Thespian Society 
 Jazz Bands
 Key Club (Kiwanis Educating Youth)
 Knit Wits Club
 Latinos Unidos
 Link Crew
 Madrigal Singers/Lorde's Ladyes
 Model UN Club
 National Art Honor Society
 National Honor Society
 PBIS Club
 Photography Club
 Point of View (Movie Club)
 Powder Puff Football
 Quill & Scroll
 Red Apron Club
 Renaissance
 S.A.D.D. (Students Against Destructive Decisions)
 SEGA
 Sign Club
 Ski/Snowboard Club
 Spirit Club
 Student Government - Mr. Hardy, Mr. Romano
 Tempest (School Newspaper)
 Travel Club
 Tremper Action Club
 Tremper Tumbao
 Trojanette Dance Team
 Varsity Club
 Vintage Vinyl
 Visual Arts Classis
 Wedding Wednesday Ensemble
 World Music Organization
 Yearbook (Classic)
 Ye Olde English Christmasse Feaste
 Yoga Club

The Classic
Tremper's 2002 edition of the Classic yearbook Coming Up for Air, was awarded the Journalism Education Association First Place, Best of Show in April 2003. In 2006, the yearbook Shift Within placed second at the JEA/NSPA Denver, 2007 Conference.

Blood drive
Tremper Student Government annually organizes the largest student-led blood drive in Wisconsin (Approximately 2000 donors), as verified by The Blood Centers of Southeast Wisconsin. The blood drive receives support from blood centers throughout southeast Wisconsin, which close down to send staff and equipment to the school.

Athletics
The athletic teams compete in the WIAA Southeast Conference. Athletic teams include:
										

Girls' bowling
Cross country - boys state championship in 1971
Football
Wrestling
Hockey (Kenosha combined team)
Baseball
Softball
Girls' gymnastics
Boys' basketball
Girls' basketball
Boys' golf
Girls' golf

Boys' soccer
Girls' soccer
Boys' swimming/diving
Girls' swimming/diving
Boys' tennis
Girls' tennis
Boys' track
Girls' track-2014 and 2015 Division 1 State Champions
Boys' volleyball
Girls' volleyball-2008 Division 1 State Champions
Cheerleading
Dance team

Notable alumni 
Reince Priebus – American lawyer and politician

References

External links
Tremper High School website
Kenosha Unified School District

High schools in Kenosha, Wisconsin
Educational institutions established in 1958
1958 establishments in Wisconsin
Public high schools in Wisconsin